The Dictionary of Uruguayan Spanish (acronym DEU) is an authoritative reference work on the Rioplatense Spanish as spoken in Uruguay. It was published by the National Academy of Uruguay in 2011 as part of the celebrations of the Bicentennial of Uruguay.

With over 10,000 entries, it deals with typically Uruguayan expressions, not used in standard Spanish. The collected material covers sports, clothing, economy, fauna and flora, sexuality, greeting and courtesy formulas, cuisine, colors, education, ethnicity, agriculture, bureaucracy, the human body, foreign affairs and much more. It comes from both ordinary and colloquial or family speech, as well as journalism, literature, chatting, blogging, advertising, as well as feminine, masculine, child or youth language, alongside medical, military, political, or trade union slang.

References

Spanish dictionaries
Uruguayan books
2011 non-fiction books